The Mysteries of Venice (Italian: I Misteri di Venezia) is a 1951 Italian drama film directed by Ignazio Ferronetti and starring Virginia Belmont, Renato Valente and Tito Schipa.  The film's sets were designed by the art director Luigi Scaccianoce.

Cast
 Virginia Belmont as Gloria
 Renato Valente as Valerio
 Tito Schipa as 	Gennarino
 Diana Schipa		
 Liliana Agrosi	
 Gino Rumor	
 Lino Boccaccini		
 Emilio Zago	
 Mario Sailer		
 Federico Ninchi

References

Bibliography 
 Chiti, Roberto & Poppi, Roberto. Dizionario del cinema italiano: Dal 1945 al 1959. Gremese Editore, 1991.
 Whittaker, Tom & Wright, Sarah. Locating the Voice in Film: Critical Approaches and Global Practices. Oxford University Press, 2017.

External links
 

1951 films
1951 drama films
Italian drama films
1950s Italian-language films
1950s Italian films
Films directed by Ignazio Ferronetti
Films set in Venice